Yusra Mardini OLY (born 5 March 1998) is a Syrian former competition swimmer and refugee of the Syrian civil war.  She was a member of the Refugee Olympic Athletes Team (ROT) that competed under the Olympic flag at the 2016 Summer Olympics in Rio de Janeiro. On 27 April 2017, Mardini was appointed a UNHCR Goodwill Ambassador. She also competed in the 2020 Summer Olympics in Tokyo with the Refugee Olympic Team (EOR).

Early life
Growing up in Darayya, a suburb of Damascus, Mardini trained in swimming with the support of the Syrian Olympic Committee. In 2012, she represented Syria in the 2012 FINA World Swimming Championships (25 m) 200 metre individual medley, 200 metre freestyle and 400 metre freestyle events.

Mardini's house was destroyed in the Syrian Civil War. Mardini and her sister Sarah decided to flee Syria in August 2015. They reached Lebanon, and then Turkey, where they arranged to be smuggled into Greece by boat with 18 other migrants, though the boat was meant to be used by no more than 6 or 7 people. After the motor stopped working and the dinghy began to take on water in the Aegean Sea, Yusra, Sarah, and two other people who were able to swim jumped into the water and pushed and pulled the boat through the water for over 3 hours until the group reached the island of Lesbos. They then traveled on foot through Europe to Germany, where they settled in Berlin in September 2015. Her parents and younger sister, Shahed, also fled Syria and live in Germany.

Swimming career 
On arrival in Germany, Mardini continued her training with her coach Sven Spannenkrebs from Wasserfreunde Spandau 04 in Berlin, in hopes of qualifying for the Olympics. She attempted to qualify in the 200 metres freestyle swimming event. In June 2016, Mardini was one of ten athletes selected for the newly formed Refugee Olympic Team. Mardini competed in the 100 metres freestyle and the 100 metres butterfly at the 2016 Summer Olympics in Rio. At the Rio Olympics, Mardini won a 100m butterfly heat against four other swimmers, with a time of 1:09.21 and a rank of 41st among 45 entrants.

International Olympic Committee (IOC) President Thomas Bach said of the refugee athletes, "We help them to make their dream of sporting excellence come true, even when they have to flee war and violence."

As of October 2017, Mardini has been the latest addition to a team of international athletes to represent the Under Armour sports brand. Chris Bate, Under Armour managing director in Europe, has said: "We are inspired by her drive and accomplishments, both as a person and as an athlete."

Mardini competed at the 2020 Summer Olympic Games in Tokyo. She carried the flag of the IOC Refugee Olympic Team  in the athletes’ parade in the opening ceremony. In the women's 100m butterfly, she swam a time of 1:06.78 in the heats, and was eliminated from the next rounds for which only the top 16 women qualified.

In popular culture 
Mardini's story is told in the short story collection Good Night Stories for Rebel Girls, by Elena Favilli and Francesca Cavallo. The story is illustrated by JM Cooper, and when the story was released as a podcast episode it was narrated by American journalist and long-distance swimmer Diana Nyad. Further, Irish musician Declan O'Rourke penned the song "Olympian" to recall Yusra's story.

On 3 May 2018, her autobiography Butterfly: From Refugee to Olympian - My Story of Rescue, Hope, and Triumph was published.

In November 2022, a biographical film, inspired by Mardini's life and titled The Swimmers, was theatrically released and distributed on Netflix later the same month. The film stars Manal Issa, Nathalie Issa, and Ahmed Malek.

References

External links

1998 births
21st-century Syrian women
Living people
Refugee Olympic Team at the 2016 Summer Olympics
Refugee Olympic Team at the 2020 Summer Olympics
Refugees of the Syrian civil war
Sportspeople from Damascus
Swimmers at the 2016 Summer Olympics
Swimmers at the 2020 Summer Olympics
Syrian emigrants to Germany
Syrian female freestyle swimmers
Syrian autobiographers